The M795 155mm projectile is the US Army and US Marine Corps' standard 155mm High Explosive (HE) projectile for howitzers. It is a bursting round with fragmentation and blast effects.

The M795 is designed to be a more lethal and have a longer range than that of the M107. The explosive payload was also improved, as was the fragmentation pattern, giving 30% higher lethality.

Description
The high-fragmentation steel body is encircled by a gilding metal rotating band, making it compatible with 3W through 8S (M3A1 through M203A1) zone propelling charges across all current 155mm howitzers. The projectile is packaged on a metal pallet with a shock-attenuating lifting plug and flexible rotating band cover. The M795 projectile is ballistically similar to the M483A1 family of cargo projectiles and may be used as a registration round for the M483A1 family. The M795 projectile is more effective against personnel and materiel at greater ranges than the older M107 projectile.

Course Correcting Fuze
In mid-2005, United Defense demonstrated a cost-effective system to improve cannon artillery accuracy with the successful firing of inert M795 155mm projectiles equipped with a two-directional Course Correcting Fuze (CCF). United Defense developed this new system together with Bofors Defence, Rockwell Collins and BT Fuze Products.

Course correction uses GPS to provide high accuracy. It can be employed on all types of U.S. 155mm and 105mm projectiles in the U.S. Field Artillery inventory.

United Defense successfully fired M795 rounds equipped with the CCF from an M109A6 Paladin to ranges of 14.5 kilometers at Yuma Proving Ground. Preliminary analysis from the demonstration confirmed United Defense's laboratory analysis and the projectiles equipped with the CCF achieved a precision error of less than 50 meters, three times better than the control rounds.

M795E1
Talley Defense Systems, Inc., has been selected for the development and fabrication of the upgraded M795E1 Propellant Grain and Igniter components. As the Army's M864 Base Burner Assembly development and production source, Talley delivered nearly one million production base burner assemblies.

An extended-range version of the M795 projectile is desirable. When fired from the M198 155mm towed howitzer (39 caliber tube) with the M203A1 propelling charge, the maximum range would be between 26.5 km (threshold) and 28.5 km (objective). The maximum range when fired from a Crusader type system (52 caliber tube) would be 34 km (threshold) to 36 km (objective). Extending the range of the M795 HE projectile provides the ability to engage at an even greater distances and provides for a munitions which is compatible with current and developmental delivery systems and their associated propellants.

The US Army has identified a need to provide extended-range 155mm HE projectiles for both current and future artillery systems. Leveraging advanced ballistic design technology from two key stockpile projectiles, the 155mm M795E1 Extended Range HE Base Burner Projectile will extend maximum range capability for the delivery of enhanced HE payload. Using the production M795 HE Projectile as a baseline, designers began optimizing ballistic configurations and incorporating an improved drag reduction system, based on the successful 155mm M864 Extended Range DPICM Base Burner Projectile. Designated the M795E1, this projectile will provide a significantly larger HE, high fragmentation warhead and improved lethality over the aging M549A1 HE Rocket Assisted Projectile, and will maintain an extended range capability to counter the longer range artillery threat of potential adversaries.

Although the current M795 offers extended range over the old M107 (22.5 km vs. 17.5 km), it falls short of the Army's other extended-range projectiles (28–30 km range). The currently approved M795 Operational Requirement Document (ORD) establishes the need for an extended-range version of the M795 to support anticipated warfighting scenarios.

Specifications
 Range 22.5 km with 39 caliber barrel
 Weight as fired: 
 Explosive content:
 TNT:  with a charge liner OR IMX-101 (IMX was adopted by the Army; Marines still use TNT)
 Length with fuze: 
 Body diameter: 154.89 mm
 Driving band diameter:
 Fuzes (with supplemental charge):

 Fuzes (without supplemental charge):

 Manufacturer: General Dynamics (formerly Chamberlain Manufacturing Corporation), Scranton Division, Scranton Army Ammunition Plant, Scranton, Pennsylvania; Day & Zimmerman, Parsons, Kansas; Mason & Hanger - Silas Mason Company

CEP
M795 CEP:
CEP 139 meters at maximum range with 39-caliber barrel

M795E1
M795E1
 Range 28.7–37 km

See also
 List of artillery
 List of crew served weapons of the US Armed Forces
 M549
 M982 Excalibur

References
 Jane's Ammunition Handbook 2003–2004

External links
M795 Projectile 155mm High Explosive HE
Defense & Security Intelligence & Analysis: IHS Jane's | IHS

155mm artillery shells
Cold War artillery of the United States
155 mm artillery